Bazooka Tooth is the fourth studio album by American hip hop artist Aesop Rock. It was released on Definitive Jux in 2003.

Critical reception

Bazooka Tooth received generally favorable reviews from critics. Metacritic gave the album a score of 74 out of 100, based on 16 reviews.

Rollie Pemberton of Pitchfork called Bazooka Tooth "another strong outing from one of underground hip-hop's most talented, thanks in no small part to its unprecedented wealth of lyrical depth and individual production style." Thomas Quinlan of Exclaim! commented that "Aesop drops abstract poetry, heartfelt stories and new millennial b-boyisms in his gruff monotone flow." Francis Henville of Stylus Magazine noted that "the beats feel somewhat restrained, lethargic and lazy" and "they are perfectly suited to Aesop's limpid down-tempo rhymes."

Meanwhile, John Bush of AllMusic felt that Bazooka Tooth lacks "the catchy, sample-driven flavor" of Labor Days. David Morris of PopMatters gave the album an unfavorable review and said, "Bazooka Tooth is almost a textbook example of what happens when a previously struggling artist gets a handful of success".

In 2013, Danny Brown named it one of his 25 favorite albums.

Track listing

Personnel 
Credits adapted from the album's liner notes.

 El-P – executive producer
 Nasa – engineering, mixing 
 Spence Boogie – assistant engineer 
 Tippy – mastering engineer 
 DJ Cip One – scratches 
 DJ paWL – scratches 
 Jer – pots and pans 
 Cannibal Ox – additional vocals
 S.A. Smash – additional vocals
 Party Fun Action Committee – additional vocals
 Murs – additional vocals
 Tomer Hanuka – illustrations
 Dan Ezra Lang – design and logos
 Ben Colen – photos
 Jesse Ferguson – product manager

Charts

Notes

References

External links 
 

2003 albums
Aesop Rock albums
Definitive Jux albums
Albums produced by Aesop Rock
Albums produced by El-P
Albums produced by Blockhead (music producer)